The Peace Cup was an invitational pre-season friendly football tournament for club teams which was held every two years by the Sunmoon Peace Football Foundation.  It was usually contested by eight clubs from several continents, though 12 teams participated in 2009. The first three competitions were held in South Korea, and the 2009 Peace Cup was held in Madrid and Andalusia, Spain. Previous winners are PSV, Tottenham Hotspur, Lyon, Aston Villa, and Hamburger SV, who were the final champions.

The tournament was originally organised and held in South Korea and contested in 2003, 2005, and 2007 between eight clubs from various countries, including the Seongnam Ilhwa Chunma, which is owned by the organizing company.

A corresponding event featuring women's national teams, the Peace Queen Cup, began in 2006.

History and format
Since 2003, the Peace Cup is being held every two years, the Sunmoon Peace Football Foundation invites football clubs from various nations. South Korea's Seongnam Ilhwa Chunma participates in every tournament as both the club and foundation are sponsored by the same organization, the Unification Church.
 
From 2003 to 2007, the Peace Cup was played between eight clubs, divided into two groups of four teams. The winner of each group qualified for the final, which was played in a single match. 2009 Peace Cup Andalucia was held in Spain, and 12 teams participated in the competition.
 
The fifth competition took place again in South Korea in July 2012, and four teams which had South Korean players entered. In October 2012, it was announced that the Peace Cup will no longer be held, following the death of Unification Church founder Sun Myung Moon.

Prize
From 2003 to 2007, the prize money of the tournament was approximately €2 million for the winning team, and €500,000 for the runners-up.

Results

Summary

Titles by club

Awards

Golden Ball 
The "Golden Ball" is awarded to the player on the basis of a vote taken among the media accredited to each Peace Cup tournament. There are also "Silver Ball" and "Bronze Ball" for the second and third best players respectively.

Golden Shoe

Controversy 
The original name of the competition was to be Sunmoon Peace Cup, named after Sun Myung Moon, the founder of the Sunmoon Peace Football Foundation. However, after being criticized that it was too religious, the organization changed its name to World Peace King Cup and started preparation for its first tournament. Before the inauguration of the cup, the Asian Football Confederation warned that the term "world" can only be used by competitions organized by FIFA, and "king" can be used by competitions held by a kingdom.

See also
Korea Cup
Peace Queen Cup
Unification movement

References

External links
Official website

 
South Korean football friendly trophies
Spanish football friendly trophies
Defunct international club association football competitions in Europe
Unification Church affiliated organizations